The Andrew B. VanHuys Round Barn is a round barn near Lebanon, Indiana, United States.  Built in 1912, it was listed on the National Register of Historic Places in 1993.

It is the only surviving historic round barn in Indiana made of concrete block construction.  There were two others built—the Hollingsworth Barn in Harrison Township, Howard County, Indiana and the Gallaham Barn in Erie Township, Miami County, Indiana—but those have been lost.

References

Barns on the National Register of Historic Places in Indiana
Buildings and structures in Boone County, Indiana
Infrastructure completed in 1912
Round barns in Indiana
National Register of Historic Places in Boone County, Indiana
1912 establishments in Indiana